The Tuskers women's cricket team is a Zimbabwean women's cricket team based in Bulawayo. They compete in the Fifty50 Challenge and the Women's T20 Cup.

History
The team were formed in 2020, to compete in Zimbabwe's two new women's domestic competitions: the Fifty50 Challenge and the Women's T20 Cup. In the Fifty50 Challenge, the side finished bottom of the group, with one win from their six matches. In the Women's T20 Cup, the side finished second in the group stage, winning three of their six matches, to qualify for the final. In the final, they lost to Eagles by 8 wickets.

In 2021–22, they failed to qualify for the final of either competition, finishing third in the Fifty50 Challenge and fourth in the T20 Cup.

Players

Current squad
Based on appearances in the 2021–22 season. Players in bold have international caps.

Seasons

Fifty50 Challenge

Women's T20 Cup

Honours
 Fifty50 Challenge:
 Winners (0):
 Best finish: 2021–22 (3rd)
 Women's T20 Cup:
 Winners (0): 
 Best finish: 2020–21 (Runners-up)

See also
 Matabeleland Tuskers

References

Women's cricket teams in Zimbabwe